Paul John Ready (born 1977) is a British actor. In 2013–2014, he played Lee in Utopia. In 2016, he played Kevin in Motherland. In 2018, he played the role of Rob MacDonald in the BBC television series Bodyguard, and Harry Goodsir in AMC's The Terror. In 2019, Paul played journalist Nick Caplan in the BBC television series MotherFatherSon. His film credits include The Death of Stalin. He received a commendation at the 2003 Ian Charleson Awards.

Early life
Ready was born in Birmingham and grew up in the town of Harborne. He attended King Edward VI Five Ways school in Bartley Green, after which he trained at London Academy of Music and Dramatic Art.

Career
At the age of 17 Ready played Romeo in the National Youth Theatre production of Romeo and Juliet at London's Bloomsbury Theatre, opposite Rosamund Pike as Juliet.

He is a regular at the National and Royal Court theatres. Recent appearances have included leading parts in Major Barbara and Saint Joan (both plays by George Bernard Shaw) and Time and the Conways by J.B. Priestley.  His West End credits include One Flew Over the Cuckoo's Nest, which starred Christian Slater. His most recent theatre role was Macbeth at the Sam Wanamaker Playhouse (2018), opposite his wife Michelle Terry as Lady Macbeth. Of his role as Macbeth the Financial Times said: "Ready is a rare bird in that he has an actorly way with oratory, but instead of keeping us at a distance from his character, it clarifies nuances and levels and paradoxically allows us in deeper."

Also appearing on television, Ready received notability in 2013 for his role in the television show Utopia. He is best known for his role as the special adviser to Keeley Hawes’ Home Secretary in the BBC series Bodyguard and Kevin in the BBC series Motherland.

In 2018 he featured as Harry Goodsir, one of the lead roles in The Terror, a 10-part series based on Dan Simmons' best-selling novel. Vanity Fair said of his performance: "Ready’s character is the heart of the show: despite the various calamities that have befallen him and his comrades, he still sees hope."

Personal life
Ready is married to actress and writer Michelle Terry. They have one daughter.

Filmography

Theatre
Mother Clap's Molly House (2001–2002)
Romeo and Juliet (2002)
Crazyblackmuthafuckin'self (2002)
Waves (2006)
Attempts on her Life (2007)
Saint Joan (2007)
Time and the Conways (2009)
London Assurance (2010)
A Woman Killed with Kindness (2011)
Noises Off (2011–2012)
Much Ado About Nothing (Royal Exchange, Manchester, 2014)
Macbeth (Sam Wanamaker Playhouse, 2018–2019)

References

External links

National Theatre profile
Paul Ready on Curtis Brown

21st-century English male actors
20th-century English male actors
1977 births
Living people
English male film actors
English male television actors
English male stage actors
British male Shakespearean actors
Alumni of the London Academy of Music and Dramatic Art
People educated at King Edward VI Five Ways
Male actors from Birmingham, West Midlands